Jacob Cawsey (born 7 May 1993) is an English footballer who last played for the St. Louis Ambush of the Major Arena Soccer League.

Career
Cawsey played non-league football in England with Barton Town Old Boys, Appleby Frodingham and Bottesford Town, before moving to the United States to play college soccer at Bellevue University in 2011. While at college, Cawsey played with Premier Development League side St. Louis Lions during their 2013, 2014 and 2015 seasons.

He returned to England with short spells at Winterton Rangers and Barton Town Old Boys, before signing with United Soccer League side Colorado Springs Switchbacks on 23 February 2016. He appeared in ten games in the 2016 season.

He is the son of former British Member of Parliament Ian Cawsey.

References

External links

1993 births
Living people
English footballers
Barton Town F.C. players
Bottesford Town F.C. players
St. Louis Lions players
Winterton Rangers F.C. players
Colorado Springs Switchbacks FC players
Association football midfielders
Expatriate soccer players in the United States
USL League Two players
Major Arena Soccer League players
Bellevue University alumni
St. Louis Ambush (2013–) players
English expatriate sportspeople in the United States
English expatriate footballers